USS Yukon may refer to the following ships of the United States Navy:

  was a stores ship in commission from 1921 to 1922 and from 1940 to 1946
 , was an oiler in service in the Military Sea Transportation Service and Military Sealift Command from 1957 to 1985
 , is a fleet replenishment oiler in service with the Military Sealift Command since 1994

United States Navy ship names